Numerous plants have been introduced to Oregon, and many of them have become invasive species. The following are some of these species:

See also
Invasive species in the United States

External links
USDA PLANTS Database USDA database showing county distribution of plant species in the US
InvasiveSpecies.gov Information from the US National Invasive Species Council

 
Environment of Oregon
Natural history of Oregon
Invasive
Oregon